Kishan Kapoor is an Indian politician and the member of Bharatiya Janata Party. He is the sitting Member of parliament, Lok Sabha from Kangra Lok Sabha constituency of Himachal Pradesh. He won the seat by a record margin of votes in the General election 2019. He has won by the margin of 4.77 lakh votes which is the 2nd largest voting percentage at 72.2% all over the country. He previously served as Food, Civil supplies & Consumer Affairs minister in the Himachal Pradesh Government. In the past, he has served three terms as a Cabinet minister and five terms as a member of the legislative assembly representing the Dharamshala assembly constituency. He is one of the senior most Bhartiya Janta Party leaders from the state.

Political career 
He was Minister for Food and Civil Supplies, Consumer Affairs and Election in HP and the member of the legislative assembly (MLA) from Dharamshala assembly constituency. Serving his third term as a minister in the cabinet of Jai Ram Thakur, he has previously held important portfolios like Industries, Transport, Town and Country Planning, Urban Development in the Prem Kumar Dhumal Cabinet. During this time, he was accompanied by Jagat Prakash Nadda, National President of the BJP, as his colleague.

Timeline 
Kapoor's timeline in politics is a long one, and he plunged into active politics at a relatively younger age.

 1970 Became a member of the Jansangh and the Janta Party
 1978 Yuva Morcha Secretary
 1980 Attended the formation of BJP
 1982-1984 Mandal Adhyaksh BJP Dharamshala
 1985 Fought first MLA election as a BJP candidate from Dharamshala constituency
 1990 Represented Dharamshala constituency as an MLA for the BJP
 1993 Won for the second time from Dharamshala and reached the Vidhan Sabha
 1993-97 Appointed Chief Whip Vidhan Sabha
 1994 Appointed the State Executive Member BJP HP
 1995-97 Remained BJP President Kangra District
 1996 Appointed BJP Election Incharge for MANIPUR Parliamentary Constituency
 1998 Won for the third time from Dharamshala constituency
 1998 Sworn in as Transport, Tribal Development, Printing and Stationery and Law Minister
 2003 Contested from Dharamshala and lost
 2004 Appointed State Spokesperson BJP Himachal Pradesh
 2007 Won for the fourth time from Dharamshala
 2008 Sworn in as Transport, Urban Development, Housing and Town and Country Planning Minister
 2009 Portfolios changed to Industries, Labor and Employment and Sainik Welfare Ministries
 2012 Contested from Dharamshala and lost
 2017 Won from Dharamshala constituency for the fifth term
 2017 Sworn in as the Food and Civil Supplies & Consumer Affairs and Election Minister
 2019 Elected as Member of Parliament from Kangra Parliamentary Constituency for the first time with a record margin of the highest voting percentage in the entire country.

References

External links

Living people
Lok Sabha members from Himachal Pradesh
Bharatiya Janata Party politicians from Himachal Pradesh
State cabinet ministers of Himachal Pradesh
Himachal Pradesh MLAs 2017–2022
India MPs 2019–present
People from Kangra, Himachal Pradesh
National Democratic Alliance candidates in the 2019 Indian general election
1951 births